The 2024 Women's Softball World Cup will be the 18th Women's Softball World Cup, an international softball tournament taking place in Dublin, Ireland; Buttrio, Italy and Valencia, Spain. The group stage will take place from July 11 to July 26, 2023, held as three separate tournaments across three nations. The finals will take place in Italy in 2024. This is the first WBSC event to be held in two stages. It will be the first time Ireland, Italy and Spain have hosted a major softball tournament. It also the first time more than one nation has hosted the tournament. The United States are the defending champions.

Qualified teams

Group stage

Group A

Group B

Group C

Finals rankings
The ranking of the wildcard spots for the finals stage are as follows.
1) Hosts
2)Top third-place team(s) in the Group Stage, based on final standings from the previous edition of the World Cup
3)Top third-place team(s) in the Group Stage based on the highest position in the WBSC Rankings at the end of the previous calendar year.

Finals

Third place play-off

Final

Symbols

Match balls
The match balls that will be used for the 2024 tournament are the Mizuno M170 balls.

Notes

References

Women's Softball World Championship
Softball World Championship